Kalyana Paravaigal is a 1988 Indian Tamil-language film directed by P.K.S.Maniraj, produced by Augustine Fernandez and Joseph Martin for Nirmal Cine Creations starring Deepa and Radha Ravi . The film was advertised as the 100th film of actress Deepa ( Unnimary ).

Cast

Deepa
Radha Ravi

References

1980 films
1988 films
1980s Tamil-language films